Georgios P. Zanias (born 16 August 1955 in Orchomenus) was briefly Minister of Finance in Greece from May to July 2012. In June 2012 he was due to be replaced by Vassilis Rapanos. Instead, he was replaced by economist Yiannis Stournaras.

Zanias was one of the chief negotiators of the bailout of Greece in 2011-2012.

Career
Zanias is Professor of Economics at the Athens University of Economics and Business where he served as Chair of the Department of International and European Economic Studies. He has previously held academic posts at the Universities of Oxford, Crete, and the Agricultural University of Athens.

He graduated from the Athens University of Economics and Business with a B.Sc. in Economics and received his master's degree from the University of Reading in England and his Ph.D. in Economics from Oxford University.

Appointments
Zanias has held many positions in the Greek government, and served as Minister of Finance in the Caretaker Cabinet of Panagiotis Pikrammenos.

Previously, Zanias served as the General Secretary of the Ministry of Economy and Finance in 2001-2004, Chairman and Scientific Director of the Centre of Planning and Economic Research, Chairman of the Council of Economic Advisers of the Ministry of Economy and Finance, Member of the Executive Board of the Hellenic Exchanges. He has served as an expert to the World Bank, the European Commission and the United Nations.

References

 

1955 births
Academics of the University of Oxford
Alumni of the University of Reading
Alumni of the University of Oxford
Athens University of Economics and Business alumni
Academic staff of the Athens University of Economics and Business
Government ministers of Greece
20th-century Greek economists
Greek government-debt crisis
Living people
People from Boeotia
Finance ministers of Greece
21st-century Greek economists